The Great Gale of 1871 was a severe storm in the North Sea which struck the north east coast of England on Friday 10 February 1871.

Shipping near the town of Bridlington was severely affected by the storm, and, in an attempt to rescue seamen, the RNLI lifeboat RNLB Robert Whitworth was put out of action and the fishermans lifeboat Harbinger upturned with nine locals on board, killing six of them.

A memorial obelisk in Bridlington Priory Churchyard commemorates 43 burials there.

28 ships were wrecked on the north east coast, and total fatalities are estimated at over 50.

See also
List of United Kingdom disasters by death toll

Further reading

1871 in England
1871 meteorology
1871 natural disasters
Weather events in England
European windstorms
History of the East Riding of Yorkshire
February 1871 events
19th century in Yorkshire